Carlos Roberto Cuadras Quiroa (born August 24, 1988) is a Mexican professional boxer who held the WBC super flyweight title from 2014 to 2016.
As an amateur he won a gold medal in the bantamweight division at the 2007 Pan American Games.

Amateur career
Cuadras won the gold medal at the 2007 PanAmerican Games by beating local James Pereira and winning the final against Dominican southpaw Claudio Marrero 15-11.

At the 2007 World Amateur Boxing Championships he lost to Joe Murray: 19-28.

Professional career
In February 2010, Cuadras knocked out Oswaldo Rodriguez to win the WBC Youth Intercontinental Super Flyweight Championship at the Poliforum Zamná in Mérida, Yucatán.

Cuadras is managed by his father Rosario Cuadras, and promoted by Japan's Teiken Promotions. He has trained with Jose Luis Bueno and others at Bueno's Gym or his own gym in Mexico, often training under Sendai Tanaka's instruction in Japan.

In September 2011, Cuadras competed for the vacant WBC Continental Americas Super Flyweight Title against Johnny García at the Foro Polanco in Mexico City. He was knocked down with García's left hook in the first round. However, after his barrage in the second round, he landed a left to the liver and a right to the jaw to floor García twice, and captured the title with the stoppage victory.

Cuadras went up a weight division and knocked out Javier Franco in the fifth round after flooring him to be crowned the WBC United States (USNBC) Bantamweight Champion at the Playa Mamitas in Playa del Carmen on June 16, 2012.

On November 13, 2014 Cuadras was scheduled to defend his title against Sonny Boy Jaro, but Jaro was replaced with Marvin Mabait due to having visa problems.

On September 10, 2016, Cuadras sustained his first defeat as a professional, when he lost the WBC world Super-Flyweight title to Roman Gonzalez by a 12 round decision in a fight broadcast in the United States by HBO Boxing.

On September 9, 2017, Cuadras lost to Juan Francisco Estrada in a very close and entertaining fight. While reading out the scorecards, legendary boxing announcer Michael Buffer, mistakenly announced Carlos Estrada as the winner, before correcting himself, and declaring Juan Francisco Estrada as the winner by unanimous decision, winning 114-113 on all three judges' scorecards.

In his next fight, Cuadras was upset by Puerto Rican McWilliams Arroyo.

Professional boxing record

See also
List of WBC world champions
List of Mexican boxing world champions

References

External links

Results
Carlos Cuadras - Profile, News Archive & Current Rankings at Box.Live

1988 births
Living people
Boxers from Sinaloa
Bantamweight boxers
Super-flyweight boxers
Boxers at the 2007 Pan American Games
Mexican male boxers
Pan American Games gold medalists for Mexico
Pan American Games medalists in boxing
People from Guamúchil
Medalists at the 2007 Pan American Games
20th-century Mexican people
21st-century Mexican people